Pauline Aitken (30 June 1893 –1958) was a British artist and sculptor.

Biography
Aitken was born in Accrington in Lancashire where her father was the town clerk and a solicitor for the Corporation of Accrington.
Aitken attended the Manchester School of Art and continued her studies at Chelsea Polytechnic and the Royal Academy Schools in London before establishing a studio in Upper Cheyne Row in Chelsea. From 1925 to 1929 she exhibited a series of bronze statuettes representing women in movement, for example the pieces Dance and Bacchante, at the Salon des Artistes Francais in Paris. She also exhibited at the Royal Academy in London between 1918 and 1932, at the Royal Scottish Academy and with the Society of Women Artists.

References

External links
 

1893 births
1958 deaths
20th-century British sculptors
20th-century English women artists
Alumni of the Royal Academy Schools
Alumni of Chelsea College of Arts
Alumni of Manchester Metropolitan University
English women sculptors
People from Accrington